Berenstein is a surname, a variant of Bernstein.

People with this surname include:
 Daniel Emilfork-Berenstein (usually known as Daniel Emilfork), Chilean actor
 David Berenstein, American physicist
 Guno Berenstein, Dutch judo Olympian

See also
 Hill 400, Bergstein, the site of the former Berenstein Castle
 Berenstain, a variant often misspelled as Berenstein